Mu Ko Siboya, also known as Ko Siboya Tambon, is a group of islands which is part of Nuea Khlong District in Krabi Province, Thailand. 
The Islands are located 15–30 kilometers south of Krabi town on the Andaman Sea.
The biggest city is Ban Ko Siboya, on the island with the same name.
The population (4,920 in 2013) relies on rubber plantations, agriculture and tourism. 
The islands are relaxed and not crowded like the near Mu Ko Phi Phi. 
Ko Daeng, a small island with restricted access, is the site of Krabi's waste plantation and dump.
Ko Siboya is the 2nd biggest in size, and most populated. Most people are working in rubber plantations around the island.
Ko Jum is the biggest island, where all the resorts are located. It is also known as Ko Pu.
Ko Cham To Lang was recently acquired by a big resort concern and will slowly be also developed and have tourism in it.

Table of Islands

Notes

References

 

Geography of Krabi province
Islands of Thailand